Ulugbek Ikramovich Ruzimov (15 August 1968 – 8 May 2017) is a retired football defender. Ruzimov is a former Uzbekistani international, who obtained a total number of 23 caps during his career, scoring two goals.

References

Sources

RSSSF

1968 births
2017 deaths
Sportspeople from Tashkent
Soviet footballers
Uzbekistani footballers
Uzbekistan international footballers
1996 AFC Asian Cup players
Association football defenders
Pakhtakor Tashkent FK players
navbahor Namangan players
PFK Metallurg Bekabad players
Asian Games gold medalists for Uzbekistan
Asian Games medalists in football
Footballers at the 1994 Asian Games
Medalists at the 1994 Asian Games